Sporosarcina siberiensis is a Gram-positive, rod-shaped and non-motile bacterium from the genus of Sporosarcina which has been isolated from the East Siberian Sea.

References 

Bacillales
Bacteria described in 2014